Tadeshi is an alternate spelling of the Japanese name Tadashi

Spelt as Tadeshi people:
 Tadeshi Umezawa
 Tadeshi, the main character in the movie The Great Yokai War